Gwon Jung-hyeon may refer to
Gwon Jung-hyeon (politician) (1854–1934), Korean politician
Gwon Jung-hyeon (cyclist) (1942–), South Korean cyclist